Chaetodon auripes, the oriental butterflyfish, is a species of marine ray-finned fish, a butterflyfish belonging to the family Chaetodontidae. It is found in the western Pacific Ocean off Eastern Asia.

Description
Chaetodon auripes has a mainly yellow body marked with a wide vertical band running through the eyes which is black with a slightly thinner white band immediately behind that. The juveniles have a black ocellus on the upper part of soft-rayed part of the dorsal fin. This fades as the fish matures. The dorsal, anal and pelvic fins are all vivid yellow in colour. The dorsal fin has 12 spines and 23-24 soft rays while the anal fin has 3 spines and 18-19 soft rays.

Distribution
Chaetodon auripes is found in the western Pacific Ocean from southern Japan, the Ryukyu Islands, Izu Islands, Ogasawara Islands, the southwest of the Republic of Korea, Taiwan the southern coast of China to southern Vietnam.

Habitat and biology
Juveniles are typically found in tidal pools and sheltered rocky areas in shallow water. They gather in aggregations although they are also often encountered as solitary individuals. It feeds on filamentous algae as well as worms, crustaceans, soft corals, stony corals, sea anemones, and some other benthic invertebrates.

Systematics
Chaetodon auripes was first formally described in 1901 by the American ichthyologists David Starr Jordan and John Otterbein Snyder with the type locality given as Nagasaki. This species belongs to the large subgenus Rabdophorus which might warrant recognition as a distinct genus.

Utilisation
This species is rare in the aquarium trade.

References

External links
 

auripes
Fish described in 1901
Taxa named by David Starr Jordan